Arthur Barrios Bonai (born 3 August 1992) is an Indonesian professional footballer who plays as a central midfielder for Liga 1 club RANS Nusantara.

Club career

Perseru Serui
He became one of the Perseru Serui players who called Alfred Riedl to follow the training camp of the Indonesia national football team on September 22–27, in Solo.

Persija Jakarta
On November 30, 2017, he signed a two-year contract with Persija Jakarta.

Return to Perseru Serui
In 2018, it was confirmed that Lerby would re-join Perseru Serui. He made his league debut on 31 March 2018 in a match against PSM Makassar. On 4 November 2018, Bonai scored his first goal against Mitra Kukar.

PSIS Semarang
He was signed for PSIS Semarang to play in Liga 1 in the 2019 season. Bonai made his league debut on 16 May 2019 in a match against Kalteng Putra at the Moch. Soebroto Stadium, Magelang.

Badak Lampung
In Middle season 2019, Bonai signed a year contract with Badak Lampung. He made his league debut on 19 September 2019 in a match against Kalteng Putra. On 18 December 2019, Bonai scored his first goal for Badak Lampung against Persija Jakarta in the 54th minute at the Sumpah Pemuda Stadium, Bandar Lampung.

TIRA-Persikabo
He was signed for TIRA-Persikabo to play in Liga 1 in the 2020 season. Bonai made his league debut on 2 March 2020 in a match against Arema at the Pakansari Stadium, Cibinong. This season was suspended on 27 March 2020 due to the COVID-19 pandemic. The season was abandoned and was declared void on 20 January 2021.

Bhayangkara
In 2019, Bonai signed a year contract with Bhayangkara. He made his league debut on 18 September 2021 in a match against Madura United. On 29 September 2021, Bonai scored his first goal for Bhayangkara against Persik Kediri in the 83rd minute at the Gelora Bung Karno Madya Stadium, Jakarta.

RANS Nusantara
He was signed for RANS Nusantara to play in Liga 1 in the 2022–23 season. On 23 July 2022, Bonai made his league debut by being starting player in a 3–2 loss match against Bali United at Kapten I Wayan Dipta Stadium.

International career
He made his debut for the Indonesia against Myanmar on 25 March 2019.

Career statistics

International appearances

Personal life
And he is the brother of the same footballer, Titus Bonai.

Honours

Club

Persija Jakarta
 Indonesia President's Cup: 2018

References

External links
 
 

1992 births
Living people
People from Jayapura
Sportspeople from Papua
Perseru Serui players
Persija Jakarta players
PSIS Semarang players
Badak Lampung F.C. players
Persikabo 1973 players
Bhayangkara F.C. players
RANS Nusantara F.C. players
Indonesian footballers
Indonesia international footballers
Liga 1 (Indonesia) players
Association football midfielders